Cochineal prickly pear is a common name which may refer to several species of cactus in the genus Opuntia including:

 Opuntia ficus-indica
 Opuntia monacantha

Opuntia